Andrușul de Jos is a village in Cahul District, Moldova, about  to the north of Galați.

Demographics
According to the 2004 Moldovan Census, Andrușul de Jos has 2,125 inhabitants.

References 

Villages of Cahul District
Populated places on the Prut